Day of the Dogs is an original novel written by Andrew Cartmel and based on the long-running British science fiction comic strip Strontium Dog.

Synopsis
Johnny Alpha and Middenface McNulty are hired by wealthy wild west aficionado Asdoel Zo to track down Preacher Tarkettle, the man who killed his family. Alpha and McNulty recruit a squad of Strontium Dogs to assist them on the mission, but all is not what it seems with Zo, and they soon find a traitor in their midst.

External links
 Review at 2000adreview

Strontium Dog
Novels by Andrew Cartmel